Anga was an ancient Indo-Aryan tribe of eastern South Asia whose existence is attested during the Iron Age. The members of the Aṅga tribe were called the Āṅgeyas.

Counted among the "sixteen great nations" in Buddhist texts like the Anguttara Nikaya, Aṅga also finds mention in the Jain Vyakhyaprajnapti's list of ancient janapadas.

Location
Aṅga proper was located between the Champā river to the west and the Rajmahal hills to the east. However, at times, its territories did extend to the sea in the south, or included Magadha in the west.

The capital of Aṅga, named Campā, was located at the confluence of the Campā and Gaṅgā rivers, and corresponds to the modern-day villages of Campāpurī and Champanagar in the eastern part of the Indian state of Bihār. According to the s, Campā was also called Kāla-Campā, while Puranic texts claim its ancient name was Mālinī.

Etymology 
According to the Mahabharata (I.104.53-54) and Puranic literature, Aṅga was named after Prince Anga, the founder of the kingdom, and the son of Vali, who had no sons. So, he requested the sage, Dirghatamas, to bless him with sons. The sage is said to have begotten five sons through his wife, the queen Sudesna. The princes were named Aṅga, Vaṅga, Kaliṅga, Sumha and Pundra.

The Ramayana (1.23.14) narrates the origin of name Aṅga as the place where Kamadeva was burnt to death by Siva and where his body parts (aṅgas) are scattered.

History

Kingdom

Vedic literature such as the  nevertheless listed the Āṅgeyas with peoples described as being of "mixed origin."

The Āṅgeya capital of Campā itself was counted until the time of the Buddha's death among the six most prominent cities of northern South Asia, along with Rājagaha, Sāvatthī, Sāketa, Kosāmbī, and Vārāṇasī.

During the Iron Age, Aṅga expanded to include Vaṅga within its borders, with the capital city of Campā being a wealthy commercial centre from where traders sailed to Suvarṇabhūmi.

During the 6th century BCE, the king of Aṅga was Dadhivāhana, who was married to the Licchavika princess Padmāvatī, who was herself the daughter of the consul of the Licchavika republic, Ceṭaka. Ceṭaka's sister Trisalā was the mother 24th Jain Tīrthaṅkara, Mahāvīra, thus making Ceṭaka his uncle and Padmāvatī his cousin; Ceṭaka himself had become an adept of the teachings of Mahāvīra and made the Licchavika capital of Vesālī a bastion of Jainism, and the marriages of his daughters contributed to the spreading of Jainism across northern South Asia. The daughter of Dadhivāhana and Padmāvatī, Candanā or Candrabālā, became the first woman convert to Jainism shortly after Mahāvīra attained .

Under Dadhivāhana's rule, Aṅga had conquered its western neighbour, the state of Magadha, hence why the  described the Māgadhī capital of Rājagaha as a city of Aṅga. This conquest brought Aṅga in direct contact with Magadha's western neighbour Vatsa, whose king Śatānīka attacked the Āṅgeya capital of Campā out of fear of Dadhivāhana's expansionism. Dadhivāhana instead sought friendly relations with Vatsa, and he gave his daughter in marriage to Śatānīka's son, Udayana. After Śatānīka's death from dysentery at the same time as a campaign against Vatsa was being carried out by the king Pradyota of Avanti, the latter became the overlord of Vatsa, and Udayana lived as a captive at the court of Pradyota, in Ujjenī.

During Udayana's captivity, the state of Kaliṅga attacked Aṅga and took Dadhivāhana captive. It was once Pradyota had restored Udayana to his throne, after the latter's marriage to his daughter Vāsavadattā, that Udayana was able to defeat Kaliṅga and restore Dadhivāhana on the Āṅgeya throne, and Dadhivāhana's daughter Priyadarśikā was married to Udayana; according to the later play , which itself rests on historical records, the Āṅgeya chamberlain took brought her into the refuge of the forest-king Vindhyaketu, from where she was captured by Udayana's army and, given the name Āraṇyikā ("she who is from the forest") after being assumed to be Vindhyaketu's daughter, was brought to Vatsa to become servant of Vāsavadattā, and later married Udayana after the Āṅgeya chamberlain recognised her as once Udayana had defeated Kaliṅga.

Aṅga's prosperity ended when, in the middle of the 6th century BCE, the Māgadhī crown prince Bimbisāra Śreṇika avenged his father's defeat against Aṅga by defeating and killing the Āṅgeya king Brahmadatta, after which Aṅga became part of the Māgadhī empire, and Campā became the seat of a Māgadhī viceroy.

Later history
During his pilgrimage there in the end of the 4th century, the Chinese monk Faxian noted the numerous Buddhist temples that still existed in Campā, transliterated  in Chinese (瞻波 ). The kingdom of Aṅga by then had long ceased to exist; it had been known as Yāngjiā (鴦伽) in Chinese.

See also 
 Magadha
 Anga Lipi
 Mahajanapadas
 Magadha-Anga war
 History of India
 History of Hinduism

Notes

References 

 
 

 

Historical Indian regions
Mahajanapadas
Kingdoms in the Mahabharata
Indo-Aryan peoples
6th-century BC establishments in India
6th-century BC disestablishments in India